Giovanni Boldini was an Italian genre and portrait painter who lived and worked in Paris for most of his career. According to a 1933 article in Time magazine, he was known as the "Master of Swish" because of his flowing style of painting.

Boldini first attained success as a portraitist in London, completing portraits of premier members of English society including Lady Holland and the Duchess of Westminster. From 1872, he lived in Paris, where he became a friend of Edgar Degas and became the most fashionable portrait painter in Paris in the late 19th century, with a dashing style of painting which shows some Macchiaioli influence and a brio reminiscent of the work of younger artists, such as John Singer Sargent and Paul Helleu.

Paintings
{| class="wikitable sortable" 
! scope="col" width="50" | Year
! scope="col" width="180" | Title
! scope="col" width="200" | Image
! scope="col" width="180" | Collection
! scope="col" width="150" | Comments
|- valign="top"
|1856 ||Self portrait at fourteen years old || || Museo Boldini ||Subject: Giovanni Boldini
|- valign="top"
|  ||Portrait of Francesco Boldini || || Museo Boldini ||Subject: Little brother of Giovanni Boldini, Francesco
|- valign="top"
|1864-65||Portrait of Lilia Monti born Countess Magnoni, oil on canvas ||  || Estense Castle (Castello Estense), Ferrara ||Subject: Lilia Monti
|- valign="top"
|||Cristiano Banti ||  || || Subject: Cristiano Banti
|- valign="top"
| ||Pig keeper ||  || || 
|- valign="top"
|1865||Alaide recovering ||  || || Subject: Alaide Banti (1855-1929), daughter of Cristiano Banti
|- valign="top"
|1865||Portrait of Diego Martelli ||  || || Subject: Diego Martelli
|- valign="top"
|1865||Giuseppe Abbati ||  || || Subject: Giuseppe Abbati
|- valign="top"
|1865||Self-Portrait while looking at a painting, oil on canvas ||  ||Galleria d'Arte Moderna in Palazzo Pitti, Florence ||Subject: Giovanni Boldini
|- valign="top"
|1865-66||Portrait of Maria Angelini ||  || || Subject: Maria Angelini
|- valign="top"
|1865-66||Diego Martelli in Castiglioncello ||  || || Subject: Diego Martelli
|- valign="top"
|1866||Portrait of the painter Alessandro Lanfredini, oil on panel ||  || Private || Subject: Alessandro Lanfredini
|- valign="top"
|1866||Portrait of Cristiano Banti with his cane ||  || || Subject: Cristiano Banti
|- valign="top"
|1866||Portrait of Alaide Banti in white dress ||  || || Subject: Alaide Banti (1855-1929), daughter of Cristiano Banti
|- valign="top"
|1866-67||Giovanni Fattori at the easel ||  || Gallerie d'Italia, Milan || Subject: Giovanni Fattori
|- valign="top"

|1870||The Connoisseur, oil on panel || || Private ||
|- valign="top"
|1873||The Model and the Mannequin, oil on panel || || Private ||
|- valign="top"
|1873||The Guitar Player, oil on canvas || || Sterling and Francine Clark Art Institute at Williamstown, United States ||
|- valign="top"
|1873||Gossip, oil on wood ||
 ||Metropolitan Museum of Art, New York City ||
|- valign="top"
| 1873 ||Les Parisiennes ||  ||Vanderbilt collection, Metropolitan Museum of Art, New York City ||
|- valign="top"
| 1874 ||La Place Pigalle ||  || ||
|- valign="top"
| 1874 ||Boy with a Circle, oil on canvas || || ||
|- valign="top"
|1875 ||Ladies of the First Empire ||  ||Vanderbilt collection, Metropolitan Museum of Art ||
|- valign="top"
|1875||A Lute Player and a Listener, oil on canvas || ||Private||
|- valign="top"
|1878||Lady admiring a Fan || ||Butterfly Institute Fine Art (Gallery), Lugano||
|- valign="top"
|1878||Newspaperman in Paris (The newspaper) || || ||
|- valign="top"
|1879||The Dispatch-Bearer (c. 1879), oil on wood || ||Metropolitan Museum of Art ||
|- valign="top"
| -1890 ||Portrait of a Dandy || || || Subject: Henri de Toulouse-Lautrec (1864–1901)
|- valign="top"
| 1882 ||Buses on the Pigalle Place ||  || ||
|- valign="top"
|1883 ||Girl with Red Shawl, oil on canvas || || Private ||
|- valign="top"
|1884||The Worldly Singer (La cantante mondana) || || Museo Boldini, Ferrara  ||
|- valign="top"
| ||The Actress Rejane and her Dog, oil on canvas || || Private ||Subject:Gabrielle Réjane (1856–1920; French actress)
|- valign="top"
|1885||The Girl with a Black Cat || || ||
|- valign="top"
|1885||Portrait of Mrs. Charles Warren-Cram, oil on canvas || ||Metropolitan Museum of Art ||Subject: Ella Brooks Carter (1846–1896)
|- valign="top"
|1881–86||Two White Horses || || ||
|- valign="top"
|1886 ||Portrait of Giuseppe Verdi || ||Casa di Riposo per Musicisti ||Subject: Giuseppe Verdi (1813–1901)
|- valign="top"
|1886 ||Portrait of Giuseppe Verdi || ||National Gallery of Modern Art, Rome ||Subject: Giuseppe Verdi (1813–1901)
|- valign="top"
|1888||Woman in Black who Watches the Pastel of Signora Emiliana Concha de Ossa, oil on canvas || || Museo Boldini, Ferrara || 
|- valign="top"
|1890||Portrait of John Singer Sargent (c. 1890), oil on panel || || ||Subject: John Singer Sargent (1856–1925; American artist and portrait painter)
|- valign="top"
|1890||Portrait of John Singer Sargent (c. 1890), oil on panel || || ||Subject: John Singer Sargent (1856–1925; American artist and portrait painter)
|- valign="top"
|1890||Portrait of Lucy Gérard (c. 1890), pastel on canvas ||  || ||Subject: Lucy Gérard (1872–1941; French actress)
|- valign="top"
| 1891 ||Portrait of the little Subercaseaux ||  || Museo Boldini ||
|- valign="top"
|1892||Portrait of Josefina Errázuriz Alvear, oil on canvas || || Private ||Josefina Errázuriz Alvear
|- valign="top"
|1892||Portrait of Madame Josefina Alvear de Errázuriz or Portrait de Madame E, oil on canvas || || National Museum of Decorative Arts Buenos Aires ||Subject: Josefina Alvear de Errázuriz
|- valign="top"
|1892||Self-Portrait || || ||Subject: Giovanni Boldini
|- valign="top"
| 1892 ||Interior of the artist's studio with the portrait of Giovinetta Errázuriz || || ||Subject: Giovinetta Errazuriz
|- valign="top"
|1894||Portrait of the Countess de Martel de Janville, known as Gypsy, oil on canvas || || Musée de la Ville de Paris, Musée Carnavalet, Paris  ||Subject: Countess de Martel de Janville (1850–1932)
|- valign="top"
|1895||Portrait of a Man Wearing a Top Hat: Poet Hanvin, from the Figaro, oil on panel || || || 
|- valign="top"
|1897 ||Portrait of Lady Colin Campbell, oil on canvas || || National Portrait Gallery, London  ||Subject: Gertrude Elizabeth Blood (1857–1911)
|- valign="top"
|1897||Portrait of J. A. M. Whistler, oil on canvas || ||Brooklyn Museum, New York ||Subject: James McNeill Whistler (1834–1903)
|- valign="top"
|1897||Portrait of Robert de Montesquiou || || Musée d'Orsay, Paris ||Subject: Robert de Montesquiou (1855–1921; Gay French poet and writer)
|- valign="top"
|1898||Portrait of Madame Georges Hugo, and her son Jean, oil on canvas || || Private ||Subject: Madame Georges Hugo (born Pauline Ménard-Dorian) and her son, Jean Hugo
|- valign="top"
| ||Room of the Painter || || ||
|- valign="top"
|1900||Portrait of a Man in a Church, watercolor || || Private ||
|- valign="top"
|1900–1910||Portrait of Marthe de Florian || || Private || Rediscovered in 2010, Subject: Marthe de Florian (1864-1939), French demi-mondaine and socialite during the Belle Époque
|- valign="top"
|1901||Portrait of Mme. Lina Cavalieri, oil on canvas || || Art Institute of Chicago, Chicago, Illinois ||Subject: Lina Cavalieri (1874–1944); Italian operatic soprano and diseuse
|- valign="top"
|1903||Portrait of a Lady, Mrs. Lionel Phillips || || ||Subject: Dorothea Sarah Florence Alexandra (1863–1940)
|- valign="top"
|1904||Portrait of Sarah Bernhardt || || ||Subject: Sarah Bernhardt (1844–1923; French stage and film actress)
|- valign="top"
|1904||Princess Radziwill with Red Ribbon || || ||Subject: Princess Catherine Radziwill 
|- valign="top"
|1905||Portrait of Elizabeth Wharton Drexel, oil on canvas ||  || ||Subject: Elizabeth Wharton Drexel (1868–1944; American author and Manhattan socialite)
|- valign="top"
|1905||The Black Sash, oil on canvas ||  || Private ||
|- valign="top"
|1905||Portrait of Countess Zichy, oil on canvas ||  || ||Subject: Countess Eleonóra Zichy
|- valign="top"
|1905 ||Portrait of Willy |||| Private|| Subject: the writer Henri Gauthier-Villars
|- valign="top"
|1906||Portrait of Ethel Mary Crocker ||  || ||Subject: lived 1891–1964; daughter of Mrs. William H. Crocker; later Countess de Limur.
|- valign="top"
|1906||Portrait of Mrs. Howard-Johnston, oil on canvas ||  || Private ||Subject: Howard-Johnston
|- valign="top"
|1906||Consuelo Vanderbilt, Duchess of Marlborough, and Her Son, Lord Ivor Spencer-Churchill, oil on canvas ||  ||Metropolitan Museum of Art, New York City ||Subjects: Consuelo Vanderbilt (1876–1964). Lord Ivor Spencer-Churchill (1898–1956).
|- valign="top"
|1908||Portrait of Marchesa Luisa Casati, with a Greyhound, oil || || ||Subject: Luisa Casati (1881–1957; Italian heiress and patroness of arts)
|- valign="top"
| 1909 ||La Passeggiata al Bois ||  || ||
|- valign="top"
|1910||Portrait de la princesse Cécile Murat, Ney d'Elchingen, oil on canvas || || Private ||Subject: Princess Cécile Murat Ney d'Elchingen (wife of Joachim, 5th Prince Murat)
|- valign="top"
|1910||Portrait of Anita De La Feria, The Spanish Dancer, oil on canvas || || Private ||Subject: Anita de la Ferie
|- valign="top"
|1910–1914||Canale a Venezia con gondole|| ||Art collections of Fondazione Cariplo||Venice
|- valign="top"
|1910|| Ritratto di Josefina Errazuriz Alvear con il suo gatto|| || ||
|- valign="top"
|1911||Portrait of Princess Marthe Bibesco, oil on canvas || || ||Subject: Marthe Bibesco (1886–1973)
|- valign="top"
|1911||Portrait of Rita de Acosta Lydig, oil on canvas ||
|| M.S. Rau Antiques, New Orleans ||Subject: Rita de Acosta Lydig (1875–1929)
|- valign="top"
|1911||Self-Portrait || ||Museo Boldini, Ferrara ||Subject: Giovanni Boldini 
|- valign="top"
|1912||Portrait of Mlle. de Gillespie, La Dame de Biarritz, oil on canvas || || Private ||
|- valign="top"
|1912||Portrait of a Lady|||| Brooklyn Museum ||
|- valign="top"
| 1913 ||The Misses Muriel and Consuelo Vanderbilt ||  || Fine Arts Museums of San Francisco || Subjects: Muriel and Consuelo Vanderbilt
|- valign="top"
|1913||Portrait of a Lady, Lina Bilitis, with two Pekineses, oil on canvas || || Private ||Subject: Lina Bilitis
|- valign="top"
|1913||Madame Michelham || || N.A. ||Subject: Madame Michelham
|- valign="top"
|1914||Portrait of the Marchesa Luisa Casati || || ||Subject: Luisa Casati (1881–1957; Italian heiress and patroness of arts)
|- valign="top"
|1914||Portrait of Mrs. Leeds || || ||Subject: May Leeds, later Princess Anastasia of Greece and Denmark (1878–1923; American heiress, later a Greek princess by marriage)
|- valign="top"
|1916 ||Lady in Rose, oil on canvas || ||Museo Boldini, Ferrara  ||
|- valign="top"
|1924 ||Portrait of Donna Franca Florio, oil on canvas ||  || ||
|- valign="top"
| ||Josefina Alvear de Errázuriz ||  || ||
|- valign="top"
| || Portrait of Madame Josefina A. de Errázuriz ||   || ||
|- valign="top"
| ||Kitchen Garden || || ||
|- valign="top"
| ||Repose in the Atelier || || ||
|- valign="top"
| ||Studies for the Portrait of Marchesa Luisa Casati || || ||Subject: Luisa Casati (1881–1957; Italian heiress and patroness of arts)
|- valign="top"
| ||The Art Connoisseur, oil on panel || || Private ||
|- valign="top"
| ||Reclining Nude, oil on canvas || || Private ||
|- valign="top"
| ||A Lady with a Cat, watercolor || || Private ||
|- valign="top"
| ||Gentleman at the Piano || || ||
|- valign="top"
| ||Woman at the Piano, oil on canvas || || Private ||
|- valign="top"
| ||Lady Pianist, watercolor || || Private ||
|- valign="top"
| ||Theatre || || ||
|- valign="top"
| ||Woman in Red || || ||
|- valign="top"
| ||The Pianist A. Rey Colaco || || ||Subject: Alexandre Rey Colaço (1854–1928; Portuguese pianist)
|- valign="top"
| ||The Rose in Vase of Sassonia || || ||
|- valign="top"
| ||Still Life with Rose || || ||
|- valign="top"
| ||Sitting in the Garden || || ||
|- valign="top"
| ||Statue in the Park of Versailles || || ||
|- valign="top"
| ||Angels || || ||
|-
|}

Prints and drawings

References

Sources
T. Panconi, Boldini, L'uomo e la pittura, Pisa (Italy) 1998
E. Savoia (a cura di), Giovanni Boldini. Il dinamismo straordinario delle linee, (catalogo della mostra), Bologna (Italy) 1999
E. Savoia (a cura di), Omaggio a Giovanni Boldini, (catalogo della mostra), Bologna (Italy) 2001
T. Panconi, Giovanni Boldini, L'opera completa (Catalogo generale ragionato legale), Firenze (Italy) 2002 
P. Dini e F. Dini, Giovanni Boldini 1842-1931. Catalogo ragionato,  Torino, 2002
E. Savoia (a cura di), G. Boldini. Dalla macchia alla sperimentazione dinamica, (catalogo della mostra), Bologna (Italy) 2003
T. Panconi, Boldini Mon Amour (catalogo della mostra, con presentazione del ministro per i beni culturali), Pisa  (Italy) 2008
E. Savoia (a cura di), Giovanni Boldini. Capolavori e opere inedite dall'atelier dell'artista, (catalogo della mostra), Milano (Italy) 2011
S. Bosi, E. Savoia, Giovanni Boldini. Il Narratore della "dolce vita" parigina, Treviso, Antiga Edizioni, 2011
T. Panconi, S. Gaddi, Boldini e la Belle Epoque (catalogo della mostra), Milano (Italy) 2011
S. Bosi, E. Savoia, La mostra di Giovanni Boldini del 1963 al Musée Jacquemart-André di Parigi da un album fotografico inedito, Milano (Italy) 2011
Boldini, Giovanni, Enzo Savoia, and Stefano Bosi. Giovanni Boldini. Capolavori e opere inedite dall'atelier dell'artista. Crocetta del Montello: Antiga.  2011. 
T. Panconi, S. Gaddi, Giovanni Boldini'' (catalogo della mostra di Roma - Venaria Reale To), Skira editore, Milano, 2017

External links
 

Works by Italian people

Boldini